Marinus John Kregel (February 18, 1911 – September 6, 1996) was an American football, basketball, baseball, and track coach and college athletics administrator. He served as the head football coach at Mission House College—now known as Lakeland University—in Plymouth, Wisconsin from 1937 to 1942 and again from 1946 to 1950, compiling a record of 40–32–2. Kregel was also the head basketball coach at Mission House from 1937 to 1943 and again from 1946 to 1951, Central College in Pella, Iowa from 1951 to 1965, and Georgia Southwestern State University in Americus, Georgia from 1965 to 1978. 

Kregel attended La Crosse State Teachers College—now known as University of Wisconsin–La Crosse—before transferring to Central College. At Central, he won four varsity letters in basketball and track, three in baseball, and two in football. In the football team, he was the regular quarterback for two seasons. Kregel graduated from Central in 1934 with a Bachelor of Arts degree in biologu and physical education.

Kregel dies on September 6, 1996, at his home in Americus.

Head coaching record

College

References

1911 births
1996 deaths
American football quarterbacks
Central Dutch athletic directors
Central Dutch baseball coaches
Central Dutch baseball players
Central Dutch football players
Central Dutch men's basketball coaches
Central Dutch men's basketball players
Georgia Southwestern State Hurricanes athletic directors
Georgia Southwestern State Hurricanes men's basketball coaches
Lakeland Muskies athletic directors
Lakeland Muskies baseball coaches
Lakeland Muskies men's basketball coaches
Lakeland Muskies football coaches
College men's track and field athletes in the United States
College track and field coaches in the United States
University of Wisconsin–La Crosse alumni
Baseball players from Chicago
Basketball players from Chicago
Players of American football from Chicago
Track and field athletes from Chicago
Sportspeople from Chicago